Nok Ok is a subdistrict (tambon) and a subdistrict municipality (thesaban tambon) in Pak Thong Chai District, Nakhon Ratchasima Province, Thailand.

Geography
Neighboring subdistricts are (from the north clockwise): Mueang Pak, Don, Kaem Sap, Sakae Rat, and Ngio.

History
While the subdistrict (tambon) Nok Ok is much older, the Tambon administrative organization (TAO) as the local administration unit was established in 1996. Effective June 30, 2008 it was upgraded to a subdistrict municipality.

Administration
The subdistrict is divided into 10 administrative villages (muban).

References

External links
ThaiTambon.com

Populated places established in 1996
Populated places in Nakhon Ratchasima province